Ako Denot Mi E Nokj (in Macedonian: Ако Денот Ми Е Ноќ) is the second solo album by the Macedonian singer Kaliopi.

Background and production history 
In January 2001 Kaliopi officially announced that for her next album she will cooperate with  Darko Dimitrov, with the release of the single and music video for the song "Ako Denot Mi E Nokj".

Production history
All songs are written and composed by Kaliopi and the album is arranged and produced by Darko Dimitrov.
Guests on this album are Stojan Dimov - sax ('Ako denot mi e nok' and 'Imam - nemam') and clarinet ('Za samo eden den'); Goce Dimitrovski - trumpet ('Dali me sakas' and 'Imam - nemam'); Edin Karamazov - guitar ('Mesecina'), altaj, kanon ('Za samo eden den'); Darko, Aleksandra, Ema and Ana - vocals ('Mesecina')

Track listings
"Ako denot mi e nok" (3:34)
music: Kaliopi Buklearrangement: D.Dimitrovlyrics: Kaliopi
"Dali me sakas" (3:21)
music: Kaliopiarrangement: D.Dimitrovlyrics: Kaliopi
"Kraj" (3:16)
music: Kaliopiarrangement: D.Dimitrovlyrics: Kaliopi
"Mesecina" (4:27)
music: Kaliopiarrangement: D.Dimitrovlyrics: Kaliopi
"Kako solza" (3:16)
music: Kaliopiarrangement: D.Dimitrovlyrics: Kaliopi
"Za samo eden den" (3:23)
music: Kaliopiarrangement: D.Dimitrovlyrics: Kaliopi
"Na pat do Makedonija" (3:46)
music: Kaliopiarrangement: D.Dimitrovlyrics: Kaliopi
"Imam - nemam"  (3:16) 
music: Kaliopiarrangement: D.Dimitrovlyrics: Kaliopi
"Ovoj cuden svet" (3:21)
music: Kaliopiarrangement: D.Dimitrovlyrics: Kaliopi
"Jas znam" (4:17)
music: Kaliopiarrangement: D.Dimitrovlyrics: Kaliopi

2001 albums
Kaliopi albums